Vinod Chandra Menon was formerly the Chief of Emergency in the UNICEF in India and now he joined as Senior Professor and Head of the School of Compassion, Peace, Humanitarian Action and disaster risk management at MIT - World Peace University, Pune.

Life and career
Vinod C Menon is the son of Narayana Menon and writer Bhadra Menon. He resides in Delhi with his wife Shashikala Altekar, and daughter Suvarna Menon and belongs to Kollam, Kerala.

He served as a member of the National Disaster Management Authority (NDMA) from 28 September 2005 – 28 September 2010. As Member, NDMA, he had the status of a Minister of State in the Government of India.

References

UNICEF people
Indian officials of the United Nations
People from Delhi

Living people

1956 births